Cecil Frank Powell, FRS (5 December 1903 – 9 August 1969) was a British physicist, and Nobel Prize in Physics laureate for heading the team that developed the photographic method of studying nuclear processes and for the resulting discovery of the pion (pi-meson), a subatomic particle.

Personal life 
Powell was born in Tonbridge, Kent, England, the son Frank and Elizabeth Caroline (née Bisacre) Powell. His father was a gunsmith. He was educated at a local primary school before gaining a scholarship to the Judd School, Tonbridge. Following this he attended Sidney Sussex College, Cambridge, graduating in 1925 in Natural Sciences. After completing his bachelor's degree he worked at the Cavendish Laboratory, Cambridge, under C.T.R. Wilson and Lord Rutherford, conducting research into condensation phenomena, and gaining his PhD in Physics in 1929.

In 1932 Powell married Isobel Artner (1907-1995), and the couple had two daughters, Jane and Annie.

Professional life 
In 1928 he took up a post as Research Assistant to A.M. Tyndall in the H.H. Wills Physical Laboratory at the University of Bristol, later being appointed lecturer, and in 1948 appointed Melville Wills Professor of Physics. In 1936 he took part in a Royal Society expedition to Montserrat in the West Indies as part of a study of a damaging earthquake swarm. He appears on a stamp issued in Grenada.

During his time at Bristol University, Powell applied himself to the development of techniques for measuring the mobility of positive ions, to establishing the nature of the ions in common gases, and to the construction and use of a Cockcroft generator to study the scattering of atomic nuclei. He also began to develop methods employing specialised photographic emulsions to facilitate the recording of the tracks of elementary particles, and in 1938 began applying this technique to the study of cosmic radiation, exposing photographic plates at high-altitude, at the tops of mountains and using specially designed balloons, collaborating in the study with Giuseppe "Beppo" Occhialini, Hugh Muirhead and young Brazilian physicist César Lattes. This work led in 1947 to the discovery of the pion (pi-meson), which proved to be the hypothetical particle proposed in 1935 by Yukawa Hideki in his theory of nuclear physics.

In 1949 Powell was elected a Fellow of the Royal Society and received the society's Hughes Medal the same year. In 1950 he was awarded the Nobel Prize for Physics "for his development of the photographic method of studying nuclear processes and his discoveries regarding mesons made with this method". César Lattes was working with him at the time of the discovery and had improved the sensitivity of the photographic emulsion. Debendra Mohan (DM) Bose (nephew of Sir J.C. Bose) and Chowdhuri published three consecutive papers in Nature, but could not continue further investigation on account of "non-availability of more sensitive emulsion plates during the war years. Seven years after this discovery of mesons by DM Bose and Bibha Chowdhuri, C.F. Powell made the same discovery of pions and muons and further decay of muons to electrons… using the same technique". He acknowledged in his book, "In 1941, Bose and Chaudhuri (sic) had pointed it out that it is possible, in principle, to distinguish between the tracks of protons and mesons in an emulsion… They concluded that many of the charged particles arrested in their plates were lighter than protons, their mean mass being … the physical basis of their method was correct and their work represents the first approach to the scattering method of determining momenta of charged particles by observation of their tracks in emulsion". In fact, the measured mass of the particle by Bose and Chowdhuri was very close to the accepted value measured by Powell who used improved "full-tone" plates. From 1952 Powell was appointed director of several expeditions to Sardinia and the Po Valley, Italy, utilizing high-altitude balloon flights.

In 1955, Powell, also a member of the World Federation of Scientific Workers, added his signature to the Russell-Einstein Manifesto put forward by Bertrand Russell, Albert Einstein and scientist Joseph Rotblat, and was involved in preparations for the first Pugwash Conference on Science and World Affairs. As Rotblat put it, "Cecil Powell has been the backbone of the Pugwash Movement. He gave it coherence, endurance and vitality." Powell chaired the meetings of the Pugwash Continuing Committee, often standing in for Bertrand Russell, and attended meetings until 1968.

In 1961 Powell received the Royal Medal, and served on the Scientific Policy Committee of the European Organization for Nuclear Research (CERN) that year, and in 1967 he was awarded the Lomonosov Gold Medal by the Academy of Sciences of the USSR (now Russian Academy of Sciences) "for outstanding achievements in the physics of elementary particles".

Death 

Powell died while on holiday with his wife in the Valsassina region of Italy, lodging in a house in Sanico, in the Province of Lecco. On 9 August 1969, near the end of a walk in the foothills of the Alps, he suffered a heart attack. Giuseppe Occhialini had a wooden bench built with Powell's name carved into a commemorative plaque, and then transported it to Premana, a village in the mountains above Lake Como. It was installed on the path where he died, outside the Rifugio Capanna Vittoria (now the Capanna Vittoria restaurant), on the Alpe Giumello, in Casargo. Occhialini's reason was, "...if that bench had already been there, Powell would probably have stopped to rest there".

Legacy 
 The Cecil F. Powell Memorial Medal was named in his honour by the European Physical Society.
 In October 2011 a replacement commemorative plaque was installed in Downside Road, Bristol.
 The Judd School, Tonbridge, had one of its four houses named after Powell (the house colour is green), from 2008-2017. The school also awards the Powell Physics and Mathematics Prize to an upper sixth form student every year in his honour.  In addition Powell is honoured by the local branch of Pizza Express, which is dedicated to him and a portrait of Powell hangs in the restaurant.
 In 2013, the International Inner Wheel Club of Lecco, in Lombardy, Northern Italy, erected a sign in memory of Powell, close to where he died, at the Capanna Vittoria restaurant, on the Alpe Giumello, in Casargo.

See also 
Marietta Blau

References

External links

 including the Nobel Lecture, 11 December 1950 The Cosmic Radiation
Portrait photograph of Powell at the American Institute of Physics

1903 births
1969 deaths
20th-century British physicists
People from Tonbridge
British Nobel laureates
People associated with CERN
Experimental physicists
Nobel laureates in Physics
Particle physicists
People educated at The Judd School
Royal Medal winners
Alumni of Sidney Sussex College, Cambridge
Fellows of the Royal Society
Anti–nuclear weapons movement
Academics of the University of Bristol